The Gaya Confederacy originated, as legend tells it, from a collection of folktales and accounts from Korean history (Provok, 2020). The legend explains that Gaya came from heaven by way of six eggs and hatched human men who would become Kings to the Gaya Kingdoms. All six Kings became rulers of the six different Gayas called Geumgwan Gaya, Daegaya, Seongsan Gaya, Ara Gaya, Goryeong Gaya, and Sogaya (Provok, 2020). Each of the Gaya states had their own unique culture and life. However, Geumgwna Gaya was the center of them all. Geumgwan Gaya consisted of nine villages and was integrated by King Suro of Gaya.

History of the Gaya Confederacy
During the period of the Three Kingdoms, Goguryeo, Baekje and Silla, Gaya was absorbed by the Silla Kingdom. The history of Gaya was not recorded in the History of the Three Kingdoms because of the Goryeo Dynasty perspective. However, the defeat of Gaya by Silla was not recorded due to the fact that Silla considered Gaya their territory (Kim, 2006).

Fall of the Gaya confederacy

“Gaya,” Kaya or Garak, is known as a confederacy that originated in South Korea. The Gaya Confederacy has many different names because of the transcription of Chinese characters from Korean (Provok, 2020). The confederacy was made up of multiple alliances, growing from the Byeonhan confederacy. The Byeonhan confederacy was one part of the three han groups. The Gaya confederacy lasted until it was included into the Silla confederacy. The confederacy was located near the Nakdong River valley in the east of South Korea. The Silla was one of the Three Kingdoms in Korea in the Korean peninsula. While in the Silla dynasty, the Gaya confederacy was important to the character of the dynasty (Provok, 2020).

The economy of the Gaya Confederacy depended on the Nakdong River, where it was positioned around. This river was infused with riches that benefited the Kingdom with an entry to the sea, iron deposits and abundant plains. The economy was based around this river with fishing, agriculture and trade of ironworks with weaponry (Kim, 2006).
The Gaya–Silla War were a series of conflicts between the ancient Korean Kingdom of Silla and the Gaya confederacy. The Gaya confederacy split as nothrwestern states fell to influence of Baekje, one of the Three Kingdoms, and southeastern fell influence to Silla (Provok, 2020).
Silla began as one of the six ruling clans of Saro. Around 80 AD, the leadership of Saro was seized and consolidated by Talhae of Silla. The state of Saro began forming a confederation with neighboring walled-town states, and gradually gained strength. Saro ultimately became the Kingdom of Silla.

The reign of Pasa Isageum 
In 88 AD, Silla built two forts named Gaso (가소성, 加召城), and Madu (마두성, 馬頭城), to guard against the encroachment of the Kingdom of Baekje and the Gaya confederacy, respectively. This led to the start of tensions with Gaya.

It was not until 94 AD that Gaya initiated hostilities against Silla. Subsequently, the two powers went to war again in 97 AD. Both of these campaigns were unsuccessful.

In the twenty-third year of the reign of King Pasa, Silla gained control over the previously independent states of Siljikgok (present-day Samcheok), Eumjipbeol (present-day northern Gyeongju), and Apdok (present-day Gyeongsan). Six years later, Silla took over the states of Biji (present-day Hapcheon), Dabeol (present-day Pohang), and Chopal (present-day Changwon) as well. These, together with U-si and Kueo-ch’il, which has been added the year before Pasa's accession, constituted a considerable increase in the territory of the Kingdom of Silla.

The reign of Jima Isageum 
Under King Jima, relations with the neighboring Gaya confederacy became peaceful, following unsuccessful invasion attempts in 115 AD and 116 AD.

See also 
History of Korea
Military history of Korea

External links
 Map of the Silla-Gaya-Paekche Wars

Gaya confederacy
Silla
Wars involving Silla